Syed Abdur-Razzaq Nurul-Ain was a Sufi saint.

Early life 
He was the successor of Sufi saint Sultan Syed Ashraf Jahangir Semnani. Among the descendants of Syed Abdul Razzaq Jilani, the line of saints of Ashrafia Jilania is one of the most reputed households of the subcontinent. Within this line, Nur-ul-Ain was the heir, disciple and Khalifa of Syed Ashraf Jehangir Semnani. He was the son of his maternal cousin. He is the 11th descendant of Sufi Syed Abdul Qadir Jilani of Jilan, Iraq. Nur-ul-Ain first met Ashraf Jahangir Semnani at age twelve in Baghdad when Semnani made a visit there and from then on never left his company. Jilani adopted Nur-ul-Ain as his son and made him the heir and caretaker. This line of saints is still observed in Ashrafia.

Career 
Syed Ashraf Jahangir Semnani died in 808 AH and Nur-ul-Ain became the heir to his throne. After strenuous spiritual training he was bestowed with Khilafat (Spiritual Successor) and from him the Ashrafi spiritual chain flourished. According to the tradition of Mirat-ul-Asrar, at the time of his death, Syed Ashraf Jahangir Semnani was either 106 or 110 years of age. In Tohfta ul Abrar, his age is written as 120 and year of birth is 688 AH. Even his adopted son, Syed Abdul Razzaq was 120 at the time of his death. He spent 12 years before he took Bayat and 68 years in travel and in the service of Syed Ashraf Jahangir Semnani and the remaining 40 years after the death of his Murshid at the throne of Khilafat. Accordingly, his birth year was 728, year of arrival in India 740 and year of death 848. His grave is located next to that of Ashraf Jahangir Semnani in the same Shrine in Kichauccha Sharif, Ambedkar Nagar District, Uttar Pradesh, India.

Works
 Maktubate Ashrafi (Letters of Ashraf) compiled by Abdur-Razzaq

Chishti Order
Sufi orders trace their origins ultimately to the Islamic prophet Muhammad, who is believed to have instructed his successor in mystical teachings and practices in addition to the Qur'an or hidden within the Qur'an. Opinions differ as to this successor. Some Sufi orders trace their lineage to Abu Bakr, the first Sunni caliph, others to 'Alī ibn Abī Ṭālib, Muhammad's cousin, whom the Shi'a regard as the first Imam.

See also
Ashraf Jahangir Semnani
Alaul Haq Pandavi
Syed Waheed Ashraf
Sufi Saints of South Asia

References

Indian Sufi saints
Chishtis
People from Ambedkar Nagar district
People from Baghdad
Sufi writers
Sufi poets
Sufi mystics
Sufi teachers
1287 births
Year of death missing